Anders Bergman (born August 6, 1963) is an ice hockey goaltender who was a member of the Swedish national team at the 1987 Canada Cup and 1988 Winter Olympics, but did not play in either event. He played for Modo and Färjestad throughout his club career.

References 

1963 births
Living people
Ice hockey players at the 1988 Winter Olympics
Olympic ice hockey players of Sweden
Modo Hockey players
Färjestad BK players